State decorations of the Republic of Serbia are regulated by the Law on Decorations of the Republic of Serbia adopted in 2009. Decorations are divided into three grades: orders, medals and commemorative medals. There are six orders and three medals.

Orders

Medals

See also
Orders, decorations, and medals of the Kingdom of Yugoslavia
Orders, decorations and medals of the Socialist Federal Republic of Yugoslavia
Orders and medals of Federal Republic of Yugoslavia (Serbia and Montenegro)

References

External links